Samuel Gerrard (1767  – March 24, 1857) was a Canadian fur trader, businessman, militia officer, justice of the peace, politician, and seigneur. He was the second president of the Bank of Montreal. From 1838 to 1841, he was a member of the Special Council of Lower Canada. In 1841, he acquired the seigneuries of Lanaudière and Carufel.

Gerrard was born in Ireland at Gibbstown House, County Meath. The Gerrards were a prosperous Anglo-Irish family who had held Gibbstown, an estate of some 1,270 acres, since the mid 17th century, and previous to that were seated at nearby Clongill Castle. Samuel was probably a grandson of the Samuel Gerrard of Gibbstown who was a friend of Jonathan Swift and visited London and Bath in 1740. Samuel was probably a younger brother of the John Gerrard (d.1838) who was High Sheriff of Meath in 1818. By 1785, at the age of eighteen, Samuel Gerrard was established at Montreal as a merchant concerned with the fur trade from Timiskaming. In 1791, he went into partnership with his future brother-in-law, William Grant, and Étienne-Charles Campion. Gerrard acted as the firm's accountant, receiving a quarter of the profits.

Legacy

Gerrard Street in Toronto is named in his honour.

External links

References

1767 births
1857 deaths
Bank of Montreal presidents
Pre-Confederation Canadian businesspeople
Members of the Special Council of Lower Canada
Canadian justices of the peace
Businesspeople from Montreal
Anglophone Quebec people
Irish emigrants to pre-Confederation Quebec
People from County Meath
Burials at Mount Royal Cemetery